Hülphers, German-Swedish family originating from Schmalkalden, Thuringia, Holy Roman Empire. Hans and Jannich Hilper immigrated to Sweden circa 1626, engaging in Swedish iron works.

A great-grandson of Hans Hilper was the early industrialist Abraham Hülphers the Older (1704–1770).

Members in selection
 Abraham Hülphers the Older (1704–1770), early industrialist, and politician
 Nils Hülphers (1712–1776), politician
 Abraham Hülphers the Younger (1734–1798), topographer, genealogist
 Walter Hülphers (1871–1957), journalist, author
 Gustav Hülphers (1884–1968), professor
 Torsten Hülphers (1901–1965), politician
 Arne Hülphers (1904–1978), pianist, Musical Director
 Greta Hülphers (1904–1995), née Greta Wassberg,singer
 Inger Modin-Hülphers (1906–1956), sculptor
 Zarah Hülphers (1907–1981), née Sara Hedberg, better known as Zarah Leander, singer

References

External links
 Hülphers, Svenskt Biografiskt Lexikon (19, 1971–1973, p. 538)

German families
Swedish families
Business families of Sweden
Swedish families of German ancestry